Friedrich Nietzsche (1844–1900) was a German philologist and philosopher.

Nietzsche, or variations may also refer to:

Academic
 The Journal of Nietzsche Studies, an academic journal devoted to the life and writings of Friedrich Nietzsche
 Nietzsche contra Wagner, a critical essay by Friedrich Nietzsche
 Nietzsche-Archiv, an organization dedicated to the life and writings of Friedrich Nietzsche
 Nietzsche-Haus, Sils-Maria, a library dedicated to Friedrich Nietzsche

Art and entertainment
 "Nietzsche", a song from the Dandy Warhols album Thirteen Tales from Urban Bohemia
 When Nietzsche Wept (novel), a 1992 novel by Irvin D. Yalom
 When Nietzsche Wept, a 2007 American film based on the novel

Other uses
 Elisabeth Förster-Nietzsche (1846–1935), sister of Friedrich Nietzsche
 Nietzsche-Haus, Naumburg, a museum dedicated to Friedrich Nietzsche

German-language surnames
Surnames from given names